Earle Hewitt Maddux SSJE (June 18, 1906 – December 1974) was a notable American Anglo-Catholic liturgist in the Episcopal Church during the twentieth century. He was professed in the Society of St. John the Evangelist in 1936. He is known best for his edition of The American Missal, first published in 1951. (This is not to be confused with the Anglican Missal or the English Missal.) Maddux was born in Fairfield, Iowa and ordained to the priesthood on June 15, 1930 in Denver, Colorado.

Maddux was chaplain to the Order of St. Anne in Arlington, Massachusetts from 1941 to 1948, and chaplain to the All Saints Sisters of the Poor in Catonsville, Maryland from 1951 to until his retirement from active ministry in 1972.

Works
A Manual for Priests of the American Church Complementary to the Occasional Offices of the Book of Common Prayer (1944)
Tenebrae Offices: The Evening Services of Wednesday, Thursday and Friday in Holy Week (1946)
The American Missal: The Complete Liturgy of the American Book of Common Prayer with Additional Devotional Material Appropriate to the Same (1951)
An American Holy Week Manual: The Liturgy from Palm Sunday through Easter Day (1958)

References
Episcopal Clerical Directory 1930-1974
Obituary, The Boston Globe, December 15, 1974

External links
An Episcopal Dictionary of the Church
About A “Manual For Priests” (1968)

1906 births
1974 deaths
General Theological Seminary alumni
Anglo-Catholic clergy
American Anglo-Catholics
American Episcopal priests
Anglican liturgists
People from Iowa